Rowy  (German Rowe) is a village and seaside resort in the administrative district of Gmina Ustka, within Słupsk County, Pomeranian Voivodeship, in northwestern Poland.

The village has a population of 310.

References

Rowy